(born December 16, 1983) is a retired Japanese mixed martial artist who most notably competed in the Bantamweight division of the Ultimate Fighting Championship. A professional competitor from 2005 to 2020, Mizugaki also competed for Absolute Championship Berkut, WEC, Shooto, and Cage Force.

Mixed martial arts career
Mizugaki began his mixed martial arts career and competed in respected Japanese promotions Shooto and Cage Force. He was the Shooto Rookie of the Year in 2005 and winner of the Cage Force Bantamweight Tournament.

World Extreme Cagefighting
Mizugaki made his World Extreme Cagefighting debut on April 5, 2009 against Miguel Torres for the WEC Bantamweight Championship in which he lost by unanimous decision in the fifth round; he can lay claim as the first to push Torres all five rounds. He fought Jeff Curran on August 9, 2009 at WEC 42, he won by decision.

Mizugaki was expected to face Damacio Page on December 19, 2009 at WEC 45, but Page was forced off the card due to an injury.  Mizugaki instead faced Scott Jorgensen and lost the fight via unanimous decision.

Mizugaki faced Brazilian jiu-jitsu ace Rani Yahya on April 24, 2010 at WEC 48. He won the fight via unanimous decision (29-28, 30-27, 29-28).

Mizugaki was set to face former WEC Featherweight Champion Urijah Faber, who was to be making his bantamweight debut, on August 18, 2010 at WEC 50. However, Faber was forced off the card with an injury. As a result, Mizugaki was also pulled from the event.

Mizugaki was defeated by Faber via first round submission November 11, 2010 at WEC 52. Mizugaki showed good take down defense but was hurt via punches toward the end of the first round, allowing Faber to take his back. After Faber was able to sink in a rear naked choke, Mizugaki refused to tap and as a result, was rendered unconscious.

Ultimate Fighting Championship
On October 28, 2010, World Extreme Cagefighting merged with the Ultimate Fighting Championship. As part of the merger, most WEC fighters were transferred to the UFC.

Mizugaki was expected to face Francisco Rivera on March 3, 2011 at UFC Live: Sanchez vs. Kampmann. However, Rivera had to withdraw from the bout due to injury, and was replaced by UFC newcomer Reuben Duran. Mizugaki defeated Duran via split decision.

Mizugaki faced Brian Bowles on July 2, 2011 at UFC 132. He lost the fight via unanimous decision.

Mizugaki faced Cole Escovedo on September 24, 2011 at UFC 135. Mizugaki utilized his crisp boxing to defeat Escovedo at 4:30 of the 2nd round via TKO.

Mizugaki faced Chris Cariaso on February 26, 2012 at UFC 144.  Cariaso defeated Mizugaki via a controversial unanimous decision. Despite the loss on the scorecards, UFC president Dana White felt Mizugaki won the bout and stated in the post-fight press conference that he would be paid a win bonus.

Mizugaki was expected to face Jeff Hougland on September 1, 2012 at UFC 151.  However, after UFC 151 was cancelled, Mizugaki/Hougland was rescheduled and took place on November 10, 2012 at UFC on Fuel TV 6. Mizugaki won the fight via unanimous decision.

Mizugaki faced Bryan Caraway on March 3, 2013 at UFC on Fuel TV 8. He won the fight via split decision, with two of the judges giving him the first and third rounds where he outstruck Caraway. This marked Mizugaki's first back-to-back wins since 2008.

Mizugaki faced Érik Pérez on August 28, 2013 at UFC Fight Night 27. He won the fight via split decision.

Mizugaki fought Nam Phan on December 7, 2013 at UFC Fight Night 33. He won the fight via unanimous decision.

Mizugaki was expected to face T.J. Dillashaw on May 24, 2014 at UFC 173. However, on March 27, the UFC announced that Dillashaw was moved up to the main event to face Bantamweight champion Renan Barão. Mizugaki instead faced Francisco Rivera. He won the fight via unanimous decision.

Mizugaki faced Dominick Cruz on September 27, 2014 at UFC 178. Mizugaki lost the fight via TKO in the first round after Cruz got a take-down and landed several punches against the cage.

Mizugaki faced Aljamain Sterling on April 18, 2015 at UFC on Fox 15, replacing an injured Manvel Gamburyan. He lost the fight via submission in the third round.

Mizugaki faced George Roop on September 27, 2015 at UFC Fight Night 75. He won the fight by unanimous decision.

Mizugaki next faced Cody Garbrandt on August 20, 2016 at UFC 202. He lost the fight via TKO in the opening minute of the first round.

Mizugaki faced Eddie Wineland on December 17, 2016 at UFC on Fox 22. He lost the fight via TKO in the first round and was subsequently released from the promotion.

Absolute Championship Berkut
Mizugaki made his debut in the ACB against Russia's Rustam Kerimov on September 30, 2017 at ACB 71. He lost the fight via TKO at 3:19 of the first round.

Next, he faced Murad Kalamov at ACB 80 on February 16, 2018. He lost the fight via unanimous decision.

In his final fight in the ACB, Mizugaki faced Pietro Menga at ACB 87 on May 19, 2018. He won the fight via unanimous decision.

Last fights and retirement
Mizugaki was expected to face Guangyou Ning at Rebel FC 9 on September 7, 2018, but the event was eventually cancelled.

Mizugaki faced Shoji Maruyama at DEEP 89 Impact on May 12, 2019, winning the fight via unanimous decision.

He then signed with Rizin and made his promotional debut against Manel Kape at Rizin 18 on August 18, 2019. He lost the fight via technical knockout in the second round. Mizugaki retired from mixed martial arts after the fight, but announced the retirement not until early June 2020.

Personal life
Mizugaki holds a master's degree in electrical engineering from Kanto Gakuin University.

In 2021, Mizugaki opened his gym, the Belva Fight and Fitness.

Championships and Accomplishments
Cage Force
Cage Force Bantamweight Championship (One time)
Shooto
2005 Shooto Bantamweight Rookie Tournament Winner
World Extreme Cagefighting
Fight of the Night (Two times)

Mixed martial arts record

|-
|Loss
|align=center|
|Manel Kape
|KO (punch)
|Rizin 18
|
|align=center|2
|align=center|1:36
|Nagoya, Japan
| 
|-
|Win
|align=center|23–13–2
|Shoji Maruyama
|Decision (unanimous)
|DEEP 89 Impact
|
|align=center|3
|align=center|5:00
|Tokyo, Japan
|
|-
|Win
|align=center|22–13–2
|Pietro Menga
|Decision (unanimous)
|ACB 87: Nottingham
|
|align=center|3
|align=center|5:00
|Nottingham, England
|
|-
|Loss
|align=center|21–13–2
|Murad Kalamov
|Decision (unanimous)
|ACB 80: Tumenov vs. Burrell
|
|align=center|3
|align=center|5:00
|Krasnodar, Russia
|
|-
|Loss
|align=center|21–12–2
|Rustam Kerimov
|TKO (punches)
|ACB 71: Yan vs. Mattos 
|
|align=center|1
|align=center|3:19
|Moscow, Russia
|
|-
|Loss
|align=center|21–11–2
|Eddie Wineland
|TKO (punches)
|UFC on Fox: VanZant vs. Waterson
|
|align=center|1
|align=center|3:04
|Sacramento, California, United States
|
|-
|Loss
|align=center|21–10–2
|Cody Garbrandt
|TKO (punches)
|UFC 202 
|
|align=center|1
|align=center|0:48
|Las Vegas, Nevada, United States
|  
|-
|Win
|align=center|21–9–2 
|George Roop
| Decision (unanimous)
|UFC Fight Night: Barnett vs. Nelson
|
|align=center|3
|align=center|5:00
|Saitama, Japan
| 
|-
|Loss
|align=center|20–9–2
|Aljamain Sterling
|Submission (arm-triangle choke)
|UFC on Fox: Machida vs. Rockhold 
|
|align=center|3
|align=center|2:11
|Newark, New Jersey, United States
|
|-
| Loss
| align=center| 20–8–2
| Dominick Cruz
| KO (punches)
| UFC 178
| 
| align=center| 1
| align=center| 1:01
| Las Vegas, Nevada, United States
| 
|-
| Win
| align=center| 20–7–2
| Francisco Rivera
| Decision (unanimous)
| UFC 173
| 
| align=center| 3
| align=center| 5:00
| Las Vegas, Nevada, United States
| 
|-
| Win
| align=center| 19–7–2
| Nam Phan
| Decision (unanimous)
| UFC Fight Night: Hunt vs. Bigfoot
| 
| align=center| 3
| align=center| 5:00
| Brisbane, Australia
| 
|-
| Win
| align=center| 18–7–2
| Érik Pérez
| Decision (split)
| UFC Fight Night: Condit vs. Kampmann 2
| 
| align=center| 3
| align=center| 5:00
| Indianapolis, Indiana, United States
| 
|-
| Win
| align=center| 17–7–2
| Bryan Caraway
| Decision (split)
| UFC on Fuel TV: Silva vs. Stann
| 
| align=center| 3
| align=center| 5:00
| Saitama, Japan
| 
|-
| Win
| align=center| 16–7–2
| Jeff Hougland
| Decision (unanimous)
| UFC on Fuel TV: Franklin vs. Le
| 
| align=center| 3
| align=center| 5:00
| Macau, SAR, China
| 
|-
| Loss
| align=center| 15–7–2
| Chris Cariaso
| Decision (unanimous)
| UFC 144
| 
| align=center| 3
| align=center| 5:00
| Saitama, Japan
| 
|-
| Win
| align=center| 15–6–2
| Cole Escovedo
| TKO (punches)
| UFC 135
| 
| align=center| 2
| align=center| 4:30
| Denver, Colorado, United States
| 
|-
| Loss
| align=center| 14–6–2
| Brian Bowles
| Decision (unanimous)
| UFC 132
| 
| align=center| 3
| align=center| 5:00
| Las Vegas, Nevada, United States
| 
|-
| Win
| align=center| 14–5–2
| Reuben Duran
| Decision (split)
| UFC Live: Sanchez vs. Kampmann
| 
| align=center| 3
| align=center| 5:00
| Louisville, Kentucky, United States
| 
|-
| Loss
| align=center| 13–5–2
| Urijah Faber
| Technical Submission (rear-naked choke)
| WEC 52
| 
| align=center| 1
| align=center| 4:50
| Las Vegas, Nevada, United States
| 
|-
| Win
| align=center| 13–4–2
| Rani Yahya
| Decision (unanimous)
| WEC 48
| 
| align=center| 3
| align=center| 5:00
| Sacramento, California, United States
| 
|-
| Loss
| align=center| 12–4–2
| Scott Jorgensen
| Decision (unanimous)
| WEC 45
| 
| align=center| 3
| align=center| 5:00
| Las Vegas, Nevada, United States
| 
|-
| Win
| align=center| 12–3–2
| Jeff Curran
| Decision (split)
| WEC 42
| 
| align=center| 3
| align=center| 5:00
| Las Vegas, Nevada, United States
| 
|-
| Loss
| align=center| 11–3–2
| Miguel Torres
| Decision (unanimous)
| WEC 40
| 
| align=center| 5
| align=center| 5:00
| Chicago, Illinois, United States
| 
|-
| Win
| align=center| 11–2–2
| Masahiro Oishi
| TKO (punches)
| GCM: Cage Force 9
| 
| align=center| 2
| align=center| 0:57
| Tokyo, Japan
| 
|-
| Win
| align=center| 10–2–2
| Daisuke Endo
| Submission (rear-naked choke)
| GCM: Cage Force 8
| 
| align=center| 1
| align=center| 4:34
| Tokyo, Japan
| 
|-
| Win
| align=center| 9–2–2
| Daichi Fujiwara
| KO (punch)
| GCM: Cage Force 7
| 
| align=center| 1
| align=center| 2:38
| Tokyo, Japan
| 
|-
| Win
| align=center| 8–2–2
| Seiji Ozuka
| Decision (unanimous)
| GCM: Cage Force 5
| 
| align=center| 2
| align=center| 5:00
| Tokyo, Japan
| 
|-
| Win
| align=center| 7–2–2
| Kentaro Imaizumi
| Decision (unanimous)
| GCM: Cage Force 4
| 
| align=center| 3
| align=center| 5:00
| Tokyo, Japan
| 
|-
| Draw
| align=center| 6–2–2
| Masakatsu Ueda
| Draw
| Shooto: Back To Our Roots 4
| 
| align=center| 3
| align=center| 5:00
| Tokyo, Japan
| 
|-
| Loss
| align=center| 6–2–1
| Atsushi Yamamoto
| Decision (unanimous)
| Shooto: Back To Our Roots 1
| 
| align=center| 3
| align=center| 5:00
| Yokohama, Japan
| 
|-
| Loss
| align=center| 6–1–1
| Kenji Osawa
| TKO (punches and knees)
| Shooto: 11/10 in Korakuen Hall
| 
| align=center| 2
| align=center| 0:59
| Tokyo, Japan
| 
|-
| Draw
| align=center| 6–0–1
| Ryota Matsune
| Draw
| Shooto 2006: 7/21 in Korakuen Hall
| 
| align=center| 3
| align=center| 5:00
| Tokyo, Japan
| 
|-
| Win
| align=center| 6–0
| Takamaro Watari
| TKO (punches)
| Shooto: The Devilock
| 
| align=center| 1
| align=center| 3:49
| Tokyo, Japan
| 
|-
| Win
| align=center| 5–0
| Tetsu Suzuki
| Decision (unanimous)
| Shooto: 12/17 in Shinjuku Face
| 
| align=center| 2
| align=center| 5:00
| Tokyo, Japan
| 
|-
| Win
| align=center| 4–0
| Teriyuki Matsumoto
| KO (punch)
| Shooto 2005: 11/6 in Korakuen Hall
| 
| align=center| 1
| align=center| 0:13
| Tokyo, Japan
| 
|-
| Win
| align=center| 3–0
| Shin Kato
| Decision (majority)
| Shooto: 9/23 in Korakuen Hall
| 
| align=center| 2
| align=center| 5:00
| Tokyo, Japan
| 
|-
| Win
| align=center| 2–0
| Naoki Yahagi
| Decision (unanimous)
| Shooto: 6/3 in Kitazawa Town Hall
| 
| align=center| 2
| align=center| 5:00
| Tokyo, Japan
| 
|-
| Win
| align=center| 1–0
| Satoshi Yamashita
| Decision (unanimous)
| Shooto: 2/6 in Kitazawa Town Hall
| 
| align=center| 2
| align=center| 5:00
| Tokyo, Japan
|

See also
 List of current UFC fighters
 List of male mixed martial artists

References

External links 
 
 
 
 

1983 births
Living people
Japanese male mixed martial artists
Bantamweight mixed martial artists
Mixed martial artists utilizing boxing
Mixed martial artists utilizing judo
Japanese male judoka
Sportspeople from Kanagawa Prefecture
Kanto Gakuin University alumni
Ultimate Fighting Championship male fighters